Megan Diane Langenfeld (born January 17, 1988) is an American, former collegiate All-American, softball pitcher and current assistant coach. She attended Centennial High School. She played infielder and pitcher for the UCLA Bruins in the Pac-12 Conference and is school career leader in saves. She led the Bruins to a title win at the 2010 Women's College World Series and was named MVP. As a member of the United States women's national softball team she won 2011 World Cup of Softball. Langenfeld is currently an assistant coach for the Oregon Ducks softball.

Langenfeld was inducted into the UCLA Athletics Hall of Fame as a member of the 2022 class.

Career Statistics

References

External links

 
 USA Softball

1988 births
Living people
Arkansas Razorbacks softball coaches
Pan American Games competitors for the United States
Softball players at the 2011 Pan American Games
Softball players from California
Softball coaches from California
Sportspeople from Bakersfield, California
Stanford Cardinal softball coaches
UCLA Bruins softball players
UCLA Bruins softball coaches
UC Riverside Highlanders softball coaches
Women's College World Series Most Outstanding Player Award winners